The Musical Times is an academic journal of classical music edited and produced in the United Kingdom and currently the oldest such journal still being published in the country.

It was originally created by Joseph Mainzer in 1842 as Mainzer's Musical Times and Singing Circular, but in 1844 he sold it to Joseph Alfred Novello (who also founded The Musical World in 1836), and it was published monthly by the Novello and Co. (also owned by Alfred Novello at the time).  It first appeared as The Musical Times and Singing Class Circular, a name which was retained until 1903. From the very beginning, every issue - initially just eight pages - contained a simple piece of choral music (alternating secular and sacred), which choral society members subscribed to collectively for the sake of the music.

Its title was shortened to its present name from January 1904. Even during World War II it continued to be published regularly, making it the world's oldest continuously published periodical devoted to western classical music. In 1947 a two volume compilation of material from the first 100 years of the magazine, edited by Percy Scholes, was published.

The journal originally appeared monthly but is now a quarterly publication. It is available online at JSTOR and RILM Abstracts of Music Literature Full Text.

Past editors
 Joseph Alfred Novello (1844–1863). Founding editor from 1844 to 1853, then again from 1856 until 1863. Son of Vincent Novello.
 Mary Cowden Clarke (1809–1898). The sister of J. Alfred Novello, she was editor from 1853 to 1856. Cowden Clarke wrote a long series of articles called 'Music among the Poets'. She induced her friend Leigh Hunt to contribute.
 Henry Charles Lunn (1817-1894). Over his 24-year editorship (1863-1887) Lunn developed The Musical Times into a periodical of considerable importance. He was particularly noted for his coverage of provincial festivals.
 William Alexander Barrett (1834–1891). Editor, 1887–1891. Barrett was an organist and composer, and from 1869 until 1891 chief music critic of The Morning Post.
 Edgar Frederick Jacques (1850–1906). Editor from 1892 until March 1897. A music critic, and from 1888 proprietor of The Musical World until its demise in 1891.
 Frederick George Edwards (1853–1909). Editor, 1897–1909. An organist, Edwards used the pseudonym "Dotted Crotchet" to write "educationally suggestive interviews with musical celebrities", as well as a many articles about "cathedrals, churches, and educational institutions". Author of Musical Haunts in London (1895).
 William Gray McNaught (1849–1918). Editor, 1909–1918. Respected adjudicator and inspector of music for schools. He wrote a series of articles on cathedrals and their musical associations.
 Harvey Grace (1874–1944). Long-serving editor from 1918 until his death in 1944. Brought an interest in contemporary developments in composition to The Musical Times. Pen name 'Feste'.
 William McNaught (1883–1953). Editor from March 1944 until his death in 1953. Son of William Gray McNaught. He continued to develop the contemporary music coverage.
 Martin Cooper. Editor from 1953 to 1956. Author of French Music (1951).
 Harold Rutland (1900-1977). Editor, 1957–1960. Pianist, critic and composer.
 Robin Hull (1907–1960). Editor, 1960. He started as Assistant Editor in October 1958, became Editor in April 1960, died on 6 August 1960, aged 53.
 Andrew Porter (1928–2015). Editor, 1960–1967. Opera librettist and music critic of The New Yorker (1972-1992).
 Stanley Sadie (1930–2005). Editor, 1967–1987. Editor of The New Grove Dictionary of Music and Musicians (1980).
 Alison Latham. Co-editor, 1977–1988. Editor of The Oxford Companion to Music (2002 revision).
 Andrew Clements. Editor, 1987–1988. Chief Music Critic of The Guardian from 1993.
 Eric Wen. Editor, 1988–1990. American musicologist, co-founder of Biddulph Recordings (1989).
 Basil Ramsey (1929–2018). Editor, 1990–1992. Organist, founder of Music & Vision (1999).
 Antony Bye. Editor from 1992.

References

External links
The Musical Times on Blogger;
The Musical Times from 1845 to 1854 at the Emeroteca Digitale Italiana.
The Musical Times

Publications established in 1844
Quarterly journals
Music journals
Music magazines published in the United Kingdom